Ephraim Smith (April 13, 1819 – November 4, 1891) was a 19th-century American physician and businessman who served as the first mayor of Boise, Idaho Territory, in the mid 1860s. For years it was believed Smith's successor, Henry E. Prickett, was the city's first elected mayor until recent research proved otherwise. Smith is also believed to have been the first treasurer of Idaho Territory. In addition to his political career, Smith also operated a drug store and private hospital in Boise.

Smith was killed in 1891 after being run over by a streetcar in Toledo, Ohio. He is buried in Pioneer Cemetery in Boise.

References

1819 births
1891 deaths
Mayors of Boise, Idaho
19th-century American politicians